Jean Bofferty (7 June 1925 – 25 June 1988) was a French New Wave cinematographer known for his collaborations with directors such as Robert Enrico, Pierre Étaix, and Claude Sautet. In 1979 Bofferty was nominated for a César Award for Best Cinematography for his work on Sautet's A Simple Story.

Selected filmography

 1962: An Occurrence at Owl Creek Bridge, by Robert Enrico 
 1964: Les Yeux cernés, by Robert Hossein
 1965: Yo Yo, by Pierre Étaix
 1966: Who Are You, Polly Maggoo?, by William Klein
 1966: Un monde nouveau, by Vittorio De Sica
 1966: Les Grandes Gueules, by Robert Enrico
 1967: Les Aventuriers, by Robert Enrico
 1967: Far from Vietnam
 1968: Love in the Night
 1968: Tante Zita, by Robert Enrico
 1968: Je t'aime, je t'aime, by Alain Resnais
 1969: The Great Love, by Pierre Étaix
 1970: The Things of Life, by Claude Sautet
 1971: , by Yves Boisset
 1972: Les malheurs d'Alfred, by Pierre Richard
 1972: Tout le monde il est beau, tout le monde il est gentil, by Jean Yanne
 1972: César and Rosalie, by Claude Sautet
 1974: Thieves Like Us, by Robert Altman

 1974: Les Chinois à Paris, by Jean Yanne
 1974: Vincent, François, Paul and the Others, by Claude Sautet
 1975: , by Yves Boisset
 1976: Mado, by Claude Sautet
 1977: Quintet, by Robert Altman
 1977: The Lacemaker, by Claude Goretta
 1978: A Simple Story, by Claude Sautet
 1978: Butterfly on the Shoulder, by Jacques Deray
 1979: Jigsaw (L'Homme en colère), by Claude Pinoteau
 1980: A Bad Son, by Claude Sautet
 1981: Les Uns et les Autres, by Claude Lelouch
 1982: Espion, lève-toi, by Yves Boisset
 1982: Le gendarme et les gendarmettes, by Jean Girault and Tony Aboyantz
 1983: Édith et Marcel, by Claude Lelouch
 1983: Waiter!, by Claude Sautet
 1984:  Dog Day, by Yves Boisset

References

External links
 

1925 births
1988 deaths
French cinematographers